The Philippine House Committee on Metro Manila Development, or House Metro Manila Development Committee is a standing committee of the Philippine House of Representatives.

Jurisdiction 
As prescribed by House Rules, the committee's jurisdiction is on the policies and programs to promote and enhance the development of the Metro Manila area which comprises 16 cities and 1 municipality.

Members, 18th Congress

Historical members

18th Congress

Vice Chairperson 
 Francisco Datol Jr. (SENIOR CITIZENS)

See also 
 House of Representatives of the Philippines
 List of Philippine House of Representatives committees
 Metro Manila Development Authority

Notes

References

External links 
House of Representatives of the Philippines

Metro Manila Development
Government in Metro Manila